The Suisun Valley AVA is an American Viticultural Area in Solano County, California, located just east of the Napa Valley wine region in the Coast Range. It was established as a wine appellation on 27 December 1982, making it among the first AVAs of California (eighteenth overall), Napa Valley being the first.

Geography
Suisun Valley is a region in the California Coast Ranges that is bordered on the east side by the Blue Ridge of the Vaca Mountains, and on the west side by the Howell Mountains, which are also called the St. George Range. The valley is located almost entirely in Solano County with a northern terminus near the county line with Napa County, and a southern terminus at Suisun Bay in the estuary where the Sacramento River enters San Francisco Bay.

Blue Ridge on the east side of the valley exceeds  elevation for much of its length.

Climate
Suisun Valley has a semi-coastal Mediterranean climate with a cool wet season from November to April, followed by a warm dry season. Moist winds blow inland from San Pablo Bay and Suisun Bay at the headwaters of San Francisco Bay almost continuously from May through October, which minimizes frost danger. The climate is classified as mid-region III under the University of California, Davis system of heat summation by degree days, averaging about 3,350 degree days per year, with the mid-valley averaging 3,250 to 3,450 degree days per year, and the upper valley averaging 3,700 to 3,750 degree days.

Geology and Soil
Sedimentary rock composed of sandstone and shale of the Great Valley Sequence that is Early Cretaceous in age makes up the bedrock that is buried beneath the fill of the valley floor. Similar sedimentary rocks crop out in the hills that border the east and north sides of the valley. By contrast, rocks of the Pliocene-age Sonoma Volcanics, which are mainly pyroclastic breccias and tuffs, with some interbedded volcanic flows, make up the Howell mountains that border the west side of the valley. Suisun and Green Valley Creeks drain the northern uplands and create an alluvial fan that covers most of the valley floor, and builds out to the south into the Suisun Marsh.

Soils developed on the alluvial fan, where most of the vineyards are located, range from a very thick layer of Sycamore silty loam that covers most of the fan on the valley floor, to thinner Rincon and Brentwood clay loams that develop where the fan laps onto the valley margins, and drainage is somewhat better. Dibble and Los Osos soils that cover sedimentary bedrock in the eastern and northern foothills, and Hambright and Toomes soils that cover volcanic bedrock on the west side generally are more conducive to grazing cattle than growing grapes.

History

Early Years
Suisun Valley is named after the local indigenous people, a distinct tribe known as the Suisun Indians, who spoke a dialect of the Patwin Indian language. Francisco Solano, a Suisun chief and protégé of Mexican General Mariano Vallejo, applied in 1837 to the Mexican government for a land grant covering his ancestral homeland. However, Solano died before the process was complete and Vallejo took over the application. About the same time, the Tolenas and Rio de los Putos grants in the northern and eastern highlands of the valley were awarded to the Armijo and Wolfskill families. The California Gold Rush of 1849 brought a tremendous influx of settlers that led to land disputes and resulted in partitioning of these original grants into smaller parcels.

Early land holders in the valley grazed cattle, but wheat, because of its drought resistance, became an important crop in the latter part of the 19th century. Orchards of dominantly pears and apricots began to replace wheat around the turn of the century and soon became the dominant crop. Although the first vineyards were planted about 1860 by John Votypke and the brothers Henry and Claus Schultz, the change over from fruit orchards to vineyards did not begin on a large scale for another hundred years.  Although wine grapes now constitute the main crop of the valley, fruit orchards are still important, as well as wheat, and various row crops such as soy beans, sorghum, corn, and sunflowers. The growing of olives for olive oil has recently become important as well, and several vineyards grow both grapes and olives.

Wine-making Industry

The first commercial winery in the valley was C. Schultz & Company, started in 1860 by the Schultz brothers Carsten and Henry, who moved from Hamburg in 1856. After operating for twenty or so years, they sold their operation in 1880 to Suisun winemaker Louis Mangels, who at the time ran one of the largest wineries in the state. Several family operations continued into the 1920s, but these disappeared, by and large, during prohibition. Wine making started up again on a small scale following World War II, and the industry has grown ever since.

The Western Solano County Grape Growers Association successfully petitioned the United States Bureau of Alcohol, Tobacco and Firearms in 1982 for formal recognition as an AVA, and the Suisun Valley Grape Growers Association formed in 2003 to promote the local industry. The latter group, now known as the Suisun Valley Vintners and Growers Association, currently lists several Suisun Valley wineries on their website. Both the Suisun Valley AVA and the Napa Valley AVA are part of the North Coast AVA, a regional  appellation that includes the grape-growing districts of six counties located north of San Francisco Bay. This allows for wines made by blending grapes from different appellations within the six county region to be identified as North Coast wines.

Irrigation
The primary source of water for the valley is the Putah South Canal, which was completed 7 November 1957 in conjunction with the controversial Monticello Dam and Lake Berryessa reservoir. The canal, which is operated by the Solano Irrigation District, began water deliveries on 15 May 1959 and currently provides irrigation water from the reservoir to most farms, vineyards and orchards in the valley.

See also
 California wine
 Howell Mountains
 Mankas Corner
 Twin Sisters
 Vaca Mountains

References

External links 

 Map of Suisun Valley AVA
 Suisun Valley Rustic Wine Country
 Suisun Valley Vintners and Growers Association

American Viticultural Areas of the San Francisco Bay Area
Geography of Solano County, California
Vaca Mountains
1982 establishments in California
American Viticultural Areas